Caner Erkin (born 4 October 1988) is a Turkish professional footballer who plays for Süper Lig club İstanbul Başakşehir and the Turkey national team.

Club career

Early years
Erkin began his professional career at the start of the 2004–05 season with Manisaspor who at the time were playing in the Second Division. That season they won the league and got promoted to the Süper Lig. During his 1.5-year stay at Manisaspor in, he scored 5 goals in 39 games. In the January 2007 transfer window, he moved to CSKA Moscow, for a £3.5 million transfer fee. He has played a total of 40 games, 7 in the UEFA Champions League and also won the Russian Super Cup on two occasions. On 31 August 2009, Galatasaray signed Erkin on a one-year loan from CSKA Moscow with an option to purchase at the end of the season.

Fenerbahçe
Erkin signed for Fenerbahçe in 2010. Starting out as a left winger, he was slowly transformed into a left-back. His performances with led to him being scouted by several prominent European clubs.

In 2014, he signed a new two-year contract.

Inter Milan
On 1 June 2016, Inter Milan announced the signing of Erkin on a free transfer in a three-year deal commencing on 1 July. Erkin was the first summer transfer addition to the squad. Under Roberto Mancini and new coach Frank de Boer, Erkin made seven appearances in pre-season friendlies. However, he did not make any competitive debut before leaving Inter on 30 August. Inter also ran out of players quota in 2016–17 UEFA Europa League, as the club was forced to reduce to 22-men squad (plus normal minimum requirement of homegrown and club-trained players) due to penalty of UEFA Financial Fair Play Regulations, thus Caner was sacrificed for other signings. Domestically, Inter had one quota left (plus another for an Inter-trained player), but left vacant.

Beşiktaş
On 30 August 2016, Inter Milan announced that Erkin's one-year deal with his homeland club Beşiktaş as on loan.

On 7 June 2017, Beşiktaş signed Erkin for €750,000 transfer fee.

On 23 August 2019, Erkin scored the second goal of 2019–20 Süper Lig Week 2 home encounter, from a cross of his gone in the net, against Göztepe S.K. which ended 3–0 in favour of Beşiktaş.

He was released at the end of the 2019–20 Süper Lig season.

Return to Fenerbahçe
On 6 August 2020, he signed a two-year deal until June 2022 with an option for an extra year. After four years at Beşiktaş, the other side of Istanbul, he returned to Fenerbahçe. On 11 September, in his first game back against Çaykur Rizespor, he assisted Gökhan Gönül's header, who was a returnee like himself.

On 4 August 2021, Fenerbahçe announced that he would not be included in the club's squad for the upcoming season according to the team's manager Vitor Pereira's decision.

İstanbul Başakşehir
On 28 January 2023, Erkin signed a 1.5-year contract with İstanbul Başakşehir.

International career
Erkin made his debut for the Turkish national football team at the age of 17 in a friendly match against Ghana in May 2006. His first goal was against Ukraine on 5 June 2012.

Career statistics

Club

International

Scores and results list Turkey's goal tally first, score column indicates score after each Erkin goal.

Honours
Fenerbahçe
Süper Lig: 2010-11, 2013–14
Turkish Cup: 2011–12, 2012–13
Turkish Super Cup: 2014

CSKA Moscow
Russian Cup: 2007–08, 2008–09

Beşiktaş
Süper Lig: 2016–17

References

External links

 
 
 
 
 
 

1988 births
Living people
People from Edremit, Balıkesir
Turkish footballers
Turkey international footballers
Turkey under-21 international footballers
Turkey youth international footballers
Manisaspor footballers
PFC CSKA Moscow players
Galatasaray S.K. footballers
Fenerbahçe S.K. footballers
Inter Milan players
Beşiktaş J.K. footballers
Fatih Karagümrük S.K. footballers
İstanbul Başakşehir F.K. players
Süper Lig players
Russian Premier League players
Turkish expatriate footballers
Turkish expatriate sportspeople in Russia
Expatriate footballers in Russia
Turkish expatriate sportspeople in Italy
Expatriate footballers in Italy
Association football midfielders
TFF First League players
UEFA Euro 2016 players